Harsud Assembly constituency is one of the 230 Vidhan Sabha (Legislative Assembly) constituencies of Madhya Pradesh state in central India.

It is part of Khandwa District.

Member of the Legislative Assembly

See also
 Harsud

References

Assembly constituencies of Madhya Pradesh